This is a list of episodes for the NBC/CBS television series Medium. The show's title is a reference to the main character, Allison DuBois (portrayed by Patricia Arquette), a psychic medium given dreams from the Powers That Be, to help solve crimes for the district attorney of Phoenix, Arizona. The series began on NBC on January 3, 2005, running for five seasons, all of which are currently on DVD. It was canceled in May 2009, but was quickly picked up by CBS and renewed for a sixth season which began on September 25, 2009. On May 18, 2010, the show announced it would run for 22 more episodes making it the show's 7th and final season; however, the order was later reduced to 13. The series finale aired on January 21, 2011. Overall, 130 episodes of Medium were produced.

Series overview

Episodes

Season 1 (2005)

Season 2 (2005–06)

Season 3 (2006–07)

Season 4 (2008)

Season 5 (2009)

Season 6 (2009–10)

Season 7 (2010–11)

References

External links 
 
 

Lists of American crime drama television series episodes
Lists of American mystery television series episodes